The 13th FINA Synchronized Swimming World Cup was held October 2–5, 2014 in Quebec City, Canada. It featured swimmers from 17 nations, swimming in four events: Duet, Team, Free Combination, and Team Highlights.

Participating nations
The 17 nations that swam at the 2014 Synchronized Swimming World Cup were:

Results

References

FINA Synchronized Swimming World Cup
2014 in synchronized swimming
International aquatics competitions hosted by Canada
FINA Synchronized Swimming World Cup
FINA Synchronized Swimming World Cup
Synchronized swimming in Canada
2010s in Quebec City
2014 in Quebec